Jean-Pierre Vigier (16 January 19204 May 2004) was a French theoretical physicist, known for his work on the foundations of physics, in particular on his stochastic interpretation of quantum physics.

Education
A native of Paris, Vigier earned his PhD in mathematics from University of Geneva in 1946 with a study on Infinite Sequences of Hermitian Operators. In 1948 he was appointed assistant to Louis de Broglie, a position he held until the latter's retirement in 1962. Vigier was professor emeritus in the Department of Gravitational Physics at Pierre et Marie Curie University in Paris. He authored more than 300 scientific papers, and co-authored and edited a number of books and conference proceedings. He was a member of the editorial board of Physics Letters A.

Vigier was a proponent of the stochastic interpretation of quantum mechanics, which was based on the ideas of de Broglie and David Bohm. Politically, Vigier was an active supporter of communism throughout his life.

Vigier was invited to be Einstein's assistant; but at the time because of his political controversy related to Vietnam the United States Department of State would not allow him entry into the United States.

Vigier died in 2004 in Paris.

Family
Vigier's father was a professor of English, such that Vigier became fluent in English and French, his native language.

References

Publications
Books
 Myron W. Evans, Jean-Pierre Vigier: The Enigmatic Photon (series in several volumes), Kluwer Academic, 1996, 
 Louis de Broglie, P A M Dirac, Eugene Paul Wigner, A O Barut, Alwyn Van der Merwe, Jean-Pierre Vigier: Quantum, space, and time — the quest continues: studies and essays in honour of Louis de Broglie, Paul Dirac, and Eugene Wigner, Cambridge Monographs on Physics, . Originally published in Foundations of physics, 1982-1983.
 Yann Fitt, Alexandre Faire, Jean Pierre Vigier: The world economic crisis: U.S. imperialism at bay, Zed Press, 1980, 
 Jean-Pierre Vigier: France's May revolution: an analysis of the French May revolt, Sydney: International Publications, 1968
 Louis de Broglie; Jean Pierre Vigier: Introduction to the Vigier theory of elementary particles: with a chapter by Jean-Pierre Vigier, Elsevier, 1963
 Pierre Hillion, Jean-Pierre Vigier: Les Ondes associées à une structure interne des particules. Sur les équations d'ondes associées à la structure des bosons. Sur les équations d'ondes associées à la structure des fermions (On wave equations associated with an internal structure of particles), Annales de l'Institut Henri Poincaré, vol. 17, no. 3, 1962
 Jean-Pierre Vigier: Recherches sur l'interprétation causale de la théorie des quanta (Research on the causal interpretation of quantum theory), Thèse d'Etat, Université de Paris, Faculté des sciences, 1954. Published by Gauthier-Villars, 1955.

Conference proceedings in honour of Jean-Pierre Vigier
 G. Hunter, S. Jeffers, J. P. Vigier: Causality and Locality in Modern Physics, Proceedings of a symposium held in honour of Jean-Pierre Vigier at York University, Toronto, Canada, in August 1997, Springer, 1998, 
 S. Jeffers, J. P. Vigier, S. Roy: The present status of the quantum theory of light: Proceedings of a symposium in honour of Jean-Pierre Vigier, Proceedings of a symposium held in honour of Jean-Pierre Vigier in Toronto, Canada, in August 1995, Kluwer Academic, 1996,

Articles (selection)

Further reading
 Peter Holland: Jean-Pierre Vigier at seventy-five: La lutte continue, Foundations of Physics, invited papers dedicated to Jean-Pierre Vigier, vol. 25, no. 1, pp. 1–4, 
 Jean-Pierre Vigier, selected and edited by Stanley Jeffers, Bo Lehnert, Nils Abramson, Lev Chebotarev: Jean-Pierre Vigier and the Stochastic Interpretation of Quantum Mechanics, Apeiron, 2000,

References
Articles on NASA ADS Abstracts Abstracts | Full text

French physicists
Probability theorists
1920 births
2004 deaths
French Communist Party members
Communist members of the French Resistance